Edmund Wodehouse may refer to:

 Edmond Wodehouse (1784–1855), British politician
 Edmund Wodehouse (British Army officer) (1819–1898)